Schenefeld (Northern Low Saxon: Scheenfeld) is a town in the district of Pinneberg, in Schleswig-Holstein, Germany. It is situated at the northwest border of Hamburg.

A 3.4 km tunnel between the town and the DESY research centre in Hamburg houses the European X-ray free-electron laser, with the research campus for the facility also located in Schenefeld.

Melanie Diener, a German operatic and concert soprano, was born in Schenefeld.

References

Towns in Schleswig-Holstein
Pinneberg (district)